Catherine "Kay" S. Fowler is an anthropologist whose work has focused on preserving the cultures of the native people of the Great Basin.
She earned her PhD from the University of Pittsburgh,
and from 1964 to 2007 taught at the University of Nevada, Reno, where she is now Professor Emerita.

Fowler is a research associate for the Nevada State Museum and the Smithsonian National Museum of Natural History where she has participated in the Council for the Preservation of Anthropological Records, and she has served as president of the Society of Ethnobiology. In 1995 she was named Outstanding Researcher of the Year at the University of Nevada, Reno.
In 2011, she was elected to the National Academy of Sciences and the American Academy of Arts and Sciences.

Selected publications
Fowler, Catherine S., and Joyce E. Bath. 1981. “Pyramid Lake Northern Paiute Fishing: The Ethnographic Record.” Journal of California and Great Basin Anthropology, 3(2): 176–186. 
Fowler, Catherine S., and Nancy Peterson Walter. 1985. Harvesting the Pandora Moth Larvae with Owens Valley Paiute. Journal of California and the Great Basin Anthropology 7(2): 155–165.
Fowler, Catherine S. and Lawrence E. Dawson. “Ethnographic Basketry,” In Handbook of North American Indians, Volume 11. Washington D.C.: Smithsonian Institution, 1986 
Fowler, Catherine S. and Sven Liljeblad. “Northern Paiute,” In Handbook of North American Indians, Vol. 11. Washington, D.C.: Smithsonian Institution, 1986. 
 Fowler, Catherine S. (compiler and editor) Willard Z. Parks Ethnographic Notes on the Northern Paiute of Western Nevada 1933–1940. Anthropological Paper Number 114 Volume 1 1990. . 
Fowler, Catherine S. In the Shadow of Fox Peak: an ethnography of the Cattail-eater Northern Paiute people of Stillwater Marsh. Nevada: Nevada Humanities Committee, 2002, 1992. .
Fowler, Catherine S. 1992. Cultural Anthropology and Linguistics in the Great Basin: Some Proposals for the 1990s. Journal of California and Great Basin Anthropology, 14(1): 13–21.
Fowler, Catherine S. and Don D. Fowler (eds.) The Great Basin: People and Place in Ancient Times. 2008.  /  (Winner of the 2009 New Mexico Book Award in the Anthropology/Archaeology/Science category) 
Sven Liljeblad, Catherine S. Fowler, & Glenda Powell.  2012.  The Northern Paiute-Bannock Dictionary, with an English-Northern Paiute-Bannock Finder List and a Northern Paiute-Bannock-English Finder List.  Salt Lake City:  University of Utah Press.

See also 

 Wuzzie George

References

Year of birth missing (living people)
Living people
American anthropologists
American women anthropologists
University of Pittsburgh alumni
University of Nevada, Reno faculty
Place of birth missing (living people)
Fellows of the American Academy of Arts and Sciences
Members of the United States National Academy of Sciences
American women academics
21st-century American women